Giuseppe Roncelli (1661–1729) was an Italian painter and priest of the late Baroque. He was active in  Bergamo and Crema.

Biography
He was born to an Italian family in Candia (Crete), which fled when the Ottomans displaced the Venetians as rulers. He was sent to seminary in Bergamo. His artistic education is poorly documented and is said to have studied or been influenced by Antonio Cifrondi and in Brescia under Antonio Tempesta. He painted for the church of the Madonna di Stezzano.

References

1661 births
1729 deaths
Painters from Bergamo
Italian Baroque painters
17th-century Italian painters
Italian male painters
18th-century Italian painters
18th-century Italian male artists